Chernyshevsky (masculine), Chernyshevskaya (feminine), or Chernyshevskoye (neuter) is the name of several inhabited localities in Russia:

Urban localities
Chernyshevsky, Sakha Republic, an urban-type settlement in Mirninsky District of the Sakha Republic

Rural localities
Chernyshevsky, Altai Krai, a settlement in Mokhovskoy Selsoviet of Aleysky District of Altai Krai
Chernyshevsky, Chelyabinsk Oblast, a settlement in Novopokrovsky Selsoviet of Kizilsky District of Chelyabinsk Oblast
Chernyshevsky, Kursk Oblast, a khutor in Verkhnekhotemlsky Selsoviet of Fatezhsky District of Kursk Oblast
Chernyshevsky, Novosibirsk Oblast, a settlement in Tatarsky District of Novosibirsk Oblast
Chernyshevskoye, a settlement in Prigorodny Rural Okrug of Nesterovsky District of Kaliningrad Oblast